Li Haiqiang is a former Chinese-born Hong Kong professional footballer. He played for various professional clubs and also the Hong Kong national football team. Li played the role of a midfielder and is nicknamed "The Golden Left Foot" because of his brilliant free kick skills.

Club career

South China

2006–07 season
He signed for South China in 2006. He was appointed as the captain in the second half of the season as the team captain Au Wai Lun served as a reserve player for the majority of matches.

On 21 May 2007, Li Haiqiang was awarded the Hong Kong Footballer of the Year after scoring 6 goals in the 2006–07 season. It was his debut season in Hong Kong First Division League and he was the first Mainland player to receive this award in its 30-year history.

On Tuesday 24 July 2007, he played an integral part of South China's Barclays Asia Trophy 2007 tournament when he scored a terrific free-kick from approximately 40-yards out against Liverpool. The goal embarrassed Liverpool goalkeeper Scott Carson and recalled memories of Ronaldinho's World Cup 2002 goal against England. South China eventually lost the game by 3–1.

2007–08 season
In the 2007–08 season, Li scored 4 goals, and all of them came from free kicks. Li Haiqiang was named Hong Kong Footballer of the Year at the end of the season for the second year in a row, as well as being named a member of the Best Eleven.

2008–09 season
In the 2009 AFC Cup second-round match against Home United FC, Li Haiqiang scored two goals and helped South China win by 4:0 to progress to the quarter finals. On 1 August 2009, at the Panasonic Invitation Cup against Tottenham Hotspur, in the 68th minute, the referee pointed to the spot following a fairly innocuous challenge by Jake Livermore on Chao Pengfei and Li Haiqiang stepped up to chip the ball into the net, scoring the second goal which resulted in South China's 2–0 victory.

2009–10 season
In the 2009 AFC Cup semi final second leg against Kuwait SC, Li Haiqiang received a back heel pass from Leandro Carrijo and scored in the 65th minute, but was ruled off-side, causing huge uproar from the capacity crowd in the Hong Kong Stadium. South China in the end lost the tie 1–3.

2010–11 season
In January 2011, Li Haiqiang received praise from South China's new signing Mateja Kežman after their first training session together.

In the 2011 AFC Cup, Li Haiqiang scored the third goal for South China against East Bengal FC in the final minutes to lead the match 3:2, but the visitors were denied victory when East Bengal FC scored a late penalty and the match ended 3:3.

In the summer of 2011, Kitchee received permission from South China to approach Li about a transfer, but Li decided to stay with South China.

Tuen Mun
In the summer of 2012, Li joined Tuen Mun.

On 30 October 2012, due to the divestment of Tuen Mun president Chan Keung, various key players, including Li, and the whole coaching team were released by the club.

International career
In 1999, Li was called up to the Chinese national football team's squad, but he did not play in any matches.

After spending two seasons in Hong Kong, Li Haiqiang qualified to play for Hong Kong national football team. His first game was a friendly against Macau national football team in Macau.

Li Haiqiang took part as captain in the 2010 East Asian Football Championship semi final tournament, held in Kaohsiung, Taiwan, helping Hong Kong qualify for the final tournament for the first time since 2003, when North Korea withdrew.

On 4 October 2010, Li Haiqiang scored with a left foot volley to help Hong Kong win a friendly by 1-0 against India.

In June 2011, just before the friendly against Malaysia, Li Haiqiang announced that he has resigned from the Hong Kong national football team in March, due to old age.

Career statistics

Club
As of 11 June 2014

1 Others include 2012–13 Hong Kong Season Play-offs.

International

Honours

Club
South China
Hong Kong First Division League (4): 2006–07, 2007–08, 2008–09, 2009–10

Hong Kong Senior Shield (2): 2006–07, 2009–10

Individual
Hong Kong Footballer of the Year (2): 2007, 2008

References

External links
 Li Haiqiang at HKFA
 Scaafc.com 球員資料 – 11. 李海強 (in Chinese)
 SCAA Official Blog 11號 李海強 (Li Hai Qiang) (in Chinese)
 BMA Football Star 

1977 births
Living people
Hakka sportspeople
Hong Kong people of Hakka descent
People from Meixian District
Chinese footballers
Hong Kong footballers
Footballers from Meizhou
Association football midfielders
Hong Kong First Division League players
Guangdong Winnerway F.C. players
South China AA players
Chengdu Tiancheng F.C. players
China League One players
Chinese expatriate footballers
Expatriate footballers in Hong Kong
Chinese expatriate sportspeople in Hong Kong
Eastern Sports Club footballers
Hong Kong international footballers
Shenzhen F.C. managers
Hong Kong football managers
Hong Kong League XI representative players